These are the orders and deliveries the Airbus A320 family.

Orders and deliveries 
List of orders, deliveries and operators of the Airbus A320 family, as of 28 February 2023:

 Ord — number of aircraft ordered from Airbus
 Del — number of aircraft delivered by Airbus
Bl — number of aircraft still to be delivered to the specified customer
 
 

Data through end of February 2023.

See also

 List of Airbus A320neo family orders and deliveries
 List of Airbus A320 family operators

References

Orders
320